Seafield Park a former Royal Navy shore establishment located near to now former RNAS Lee-on-Solent, Hampshire

Units

The following units were here at some point: 
 RN Air Medical School
 Royal Navy Survival Equipment School

References

Citations

Bibliography

Royal Navy shore establishments